Campagnoli is an Italian surname. Notable people with the surname include:

Bartolomeo Campagnoli (1751–1827), Italian violinist
Edy Campagnoli (1934–1995), Italian television personality and actress
José María Campagnoli, Argentine prosecutor
 Marcela Campagnoli, Argentine politician 
 Mauro Campagnoli, Italian anthropologist, ethnomusicologist and composer
 Renato Campagnoli, Italian professional golfer 

Italian-language surnames